Rallapalli Venkata Narasimha Rao (15 August 1945 – 17 May 2019), popularly known as Rallapalli, was an Indian actor known for his works primarily in Telugu films and television. He received two state Nandi Awards.

Life and career 
Rallapalli Venkata Narasimha Rao was born in Anantapuramu, Andhra Pradesh in 1945.

He started off his career in 1960 as a theatre artist before marking his movie debut in 1974 with Sthree. He acted in about 850 films in a variety of roles, including that of a lead actor. He also worked as a staff artiste in Ministry of Information and Broadcasting. He played pivotal roles in films such as Bombay and Minsara Kanavu in Tamil.

Death
Rallapalli died on 17 May 2019 at Maxcure Hospital, Hyderabad following ill health.

Filmography

Awards
Nandi Awards
Best Male Comedian - Patnam Pilla Palletoori Chinnodu (1986)
Best Male Comedian - ''Jeevana Jyothi (1988)

References

External links

 

Telugu male actors
Indian male film actors
Indian male stage actors
Male actors in Tamil cinema
Male actors in Hindi cinema
Telugu comedians
Nandi Award winners
People from Anantapur district
Indian male comedians
20th-century Indian male actors
21st-century Indian male actors
Male actors from Andhra Pradesh
1945 births
2019 deaths